The Valea Lungă is a right tributary of the river Ilișua in Romania. It flows into the Ilișua in Târlișua.

References

Rivers of Romania
Rivers of Bistrița-Năsăud County